The 2017 LFA Segunda Divisao Promotion Playoff is the first season of the Liga Futebol Amadora Segunda Divisao Promotion Playoff. The tournament began on May 16 and finished on May 31.

All games are played at the Dili Municipal Stadium.

Stadiums  
 Primary venues used in the 2017 LFA Segunda Divisao Promotion Playoff:

Teams
12 clubs entered a knock-out tournament to determine 3 clubs to be promoted to 2018 Segunda Divisao.

Locations

First round
This round match held between 16 and 22 May 2017.

|-

|}

Second round
This round match held between 23 and 24 May 2017. União Tokodede and Lalenok United received a bye.

|-

|}

Semifinals
The semifinals held between 26 and 28 May 2017. 

|-

|}

FC Lero promoted.

Lalenok United promoted.

Play-off
The final held on 31 May 2017 in Municipal Stadium. 

|-

|}

Fitun Estudante promoted.

See also
 2017 LFA Primeira
 2017 LFA Segunda
 2017 Taça 12 de Novembro
 2017 LFA Super Taça

References

External links
Official website
Official Facebook page

Liga Futebol Amadora
Timor-Leste